Christopher Cross (born Christopher Charles Geppert; May 3, 1951) is an American singer-songwriter from San Antonio, Texas.
He won five Grammy Awards for his eponymous debut album released in 1979. The singles "Sailing" (1980), and "Arthur's Theme (Best That You Can Do)" (from the 1981 film Arthur) peaked at number one on the U.S. Billboard Hot 100. "Sailing" earned three Grammys in 1981, while "Arthur's Theme" won the Oscar for Best Original Song in 1981 (with co-composers Burt Bacharach, Carole Bayer Sager, and Peter Allen).

Career

Early musical career
Geppert, bassist Andy Salmon, and keyboardist Rob Meurer met in San Antonio when they were still teens. Geppert and Salmon became bandmates in Flash, with Geppert on guitar. Together, they formed Christopher Cross as a band and moved to Austin, where they added drummer Tommy Taylor. There, they played covers for cash while recording demo versions of original songs at Austin's Pecan Street Studios, which they shopped to record labels. Though they considered themselves a band, Warner Bros. signed Christopher Cross as a solo artist in early 1979.

Although best known for his vocals and songwriting, Cross is also a skilled guitarist. Donald Fagen and Walter Becker of Steely Dan invited Cross to play on their albums, but Cross declined. Cross also substituted for Richie Blackmore during a Deep Purple concert in 1970 when Blackmore fell ill.

The first album and immediate success
Cross released his self-titled debut album, Christopher Cross, on December 27, 1979. Billboard Hot 100 top 20 hits from this album included "Ride Like the Wind" (featuring backing vocals by Michael McDonald), "Sailing", "Never Be the Same" and "Say You'll Be Mine" (featuring backing vocals by Nicolette Larson). "Ride Like the Wind" hit number two on the U.S. Hot 100, while "Sailing" topped the chart for one week. "Never Be The Same" went number one on the Adult Contemporary chart. Cross, the album, and the song "Sailing" were nominated for six Grammy Awards in 1981 and won five. Cross was the first artist in Grammy history to win all four general field awards in a single ceremony, bringing home Record of the Year ("Sailing"), Album of the Year (Christopher Cross), Song of the Year ("Sailing") and Best New Artist at the 23rd Annual Grammy Awards. This feat was not replicated for 39 years, until Billie Eilish won all four awards at the 62nd Annual Grammy Awards in 2020. In addition, "Sailing" won for Best Arrangement Accompanying Vocalist(s). Christopher Cross has been certified platinum five times in the U.S., selling over 5 million copies.

Later in 1981, Cross released "Arthur's Theme (Best That You Can Do)", co-written by Burt Bacharach, which was the main theme for the 1981 film Arthur. The song won the Oscar for Best Original Song in 1981, and was nominated for three Grammys, but did not win. In the U.S., it reached number one on the Billboard Hot 100 and on the Hot Adult Contemporary charts in October 1981, remaining at the top of the Hot 100 for three weeks while it also was a top-ten hit in several other countries. The song became the second and last American number-one hit by Christopher Cross.

The second album
Cross's second album, Another Page (1983), produced "All Right", "No Time for Talk", and "Think of Laura". "All Right" was used by CBS Sports for its highlights montage following the 1983 NCAA Division I men's basketball tournament, while "Think of Laura" is used as a reference to characters on the soap opera General Hospital. Cross allowed ABC to use his song in this context; however, he has stated that he wrote "Think of Laura" not in reference to the television characters, but to celebrate the life of Denison University college student Laura Carter who was killed when she was struck by a stray bullet. Another Page sold well, getting Gold certification. He also co-wrote and sang the song "A Chance For Heaven" for the 1984 Summer Olympic Games.

The 1980s
After 1984, Cross's star quickly dimmed. As music television channel MTV grew to dominate the mainstream music scene in the United States, Cross's style of music proved to be a bad fit for the network, and Cross's brand of adult contemporary music declined in popularity.

Cross's next two albums, 1985's Every Turn of the World and 1988's Back of My Mind did not produce any top 40 hits or reach Gold or Platinum status.

He did, however, place the song "Swept Away" in the TV show Growing Pains. It was used during a video montage while Kirk Cameron's character Mike fell in love with a local girl while vacationing with the family in Hawaii.

The 1990s
Cross made three more albums in the 1990s, and although some of his releases gained critical response, he was not able to attract the mass audience he once enjoyed. After his decline in fame in the mid-1980s, he toured and opened for various acts during the 1990s.

The 2000s

The year 2002 saw the release of the Very Best of... album, and in 2007 he completed a Christmas album titled A Christopher Cross Christmas. In 2008, Cross recorded a new acoustic album of his hits titled The Cafe Carlyle Sessions.

The 2010s
In 2011, Cross released a new studio album titled Doctor Faith.

In 2013, he released A Night in Paris, a 2-CD live album he recorded and filmed in April 2012 at the Theatre Le Trianon in Paris, France.

The song "Ride Like the Wind" was featured on the Anchorman 2: The Legend Continues original movie soundtrack, released in 2013.

In September 2014, he released Secret Ladder, followed in November 2017 by Take Me as I Am.

In 2017, he played a concert in his hometown, at the Tobin Center, San Antonio, Texas. In 2018, he joined with other musicians in Austin to form the band Freedonia.

In late 2019, Cross toured with Todd Rundgren, Jason Scheff, Micky Dolenz and Joey Molland of Badfinger in celebration of the Beatles' White Album on the "It Was Fifty Years Ago Today – A Tribute to the Beatles' White Album". Cross performed "Sailing" and "Ride Like the Wind".

Since 2018, Cross has been playing in a band called Freedonia. They have 2 full length albums: "Freedonia" and "Firefly" and an EP titled "Bring Back The Dinosaurs".

The 2020s
Cross played in 20212022 his 40th anniversary tour which due to COVID-19 had been rescheduled.

Flamingo
One common feature of Cross's album covers is the appearance of a flamingo. According to Cross, there is no meaning behind this other than the painting chosen for his first album cover featured the bird, which has been used as a motif ever since.

Personal life
A self-described "Army brat", Cross is the son of a U.S. Army pediatrician stationed at Walter Reed Army Hospital in Washington, D.C., in the mid-1950s, acting as physician for President Dwight Eisenhower's grandchildren. He attended Alamo Heights High School in San Antonio and graduated in 1969. He was involved in football and track and field.
Cross was married to Roseanne Harrison from 1973 until the couple divorced in 1982. His 1988 marriage to Jan Bunch ended in a 2007 divorce.

On April 3, 2020, Cross confirmed through his Facebook page that he had tested positive for the COVID-19 virus, and was ill, but was recovering. Cross later reported on Twitter that he had lost the use of his legs, but his doctors told him he should fully recover. Physicians told him his COVID-19 disease triggered an episode of Guillain–Barré syndrome that caused the nerves in his legs to stop functioning properly. By October 2020, he was able to walk with a cane, but said his memory and speech had been affected.
In 2021 and 2022 he played his 40th anniversary concert tour, which had originally been planned for 2020.

Discography

Studio albums

Compilations
1991: The Best of Christopher Cross (WEA)
1999: Greatest Hits Live (CMC)
2001: Definitive Christopher Cross (Warner Bros./Asia)
2002: The Very Best of Christopher Cross (Warner Bros.)
2011: Crosswords: The Best of Christopher Cross (101 Distribution)

Soundtracks
1981: Arthur (Motion picture soundtrack) "Arthur's Theme (Best That You Can Do)"
1983: General Hospital (TV series soundtrack) "Think of Laura"
1984: Official Music of the XXIIIrd Olympiad "A Chance For Heaven" (swimming theme)
1986: Nothing in Common (Motion picture soundtrack) "Loving Strangers (David's Theme)"
2010: 30 Rock (TV series soundtrack) "Lemon's Theme"

Singles

Other appearances
1974: Electromagnets, (with Eric Johnson) - "Motion"
1981: Chris Christian, (Boardwalk Records) - "Don't Give Up on Us" (guitar solo)
1982: Long Time Friends, Alessi Brothers - "Forever" (background vocals)
1985: Soul Kiss, Olivia Newton-John - "You Were Great, How Was I?" (background vocals)
1985: Crazy from the Heat, David Lee Roth - "California Girls" (background vocals)
1988: Brian Wilson, Brian Wilson - "Night Time" (background vocals)
1989: Christmas at My House, Larry Carlton - "Ringing the Bells of Christmas"
1991: Love Can Do That, Elaine Paige - "Same Train"
1994: Grammy's Greatest Moments Volume III - "Arthur's Theme" (live version)
1996: Venus Isle, Eric Johnson - "Lonely in the Night" (background vocals)
1996: On Air, Alan Parsons - "So Far Away"
1998: Imagination, Brian Wilson (special edition "Words and Music" bonus disc) - "In My Room"
2001: A Gathering of Friends, Michael McDonald - "Ride Like the Wind"
2001: When It All Goes South, Alabama - "Love Remains"
2004: Confidential, Peter White - "She's in Love"
2006: Skylark, Gigi Mackenzie - "That's All"
2008: Soundstage: America Live in Chicago - "Lonely People", "A Horse with No Name"
2013: Train Keeps a Rolling, Jeff Golub - "How Long"
2013: Imagination of You, Eric Johnson - "Imagination of You"Golden Globe Award for best original song

Awards
Academy Award, 1981 – Best Original Song, "Arthur's Theme (Best That You Can Do)"
Golden Globe Award, 1981 – Best Original Song, "Arthur's Theme (Best That You Can Do)"
Grammy, 1981 – Record of the Year – "Sailing" 
Grammy, 1981 – Song of the Year – "Sailing"
Grammy, 1981 – Album of the Year – Christopher Cross
Grammy, 1981 – Best New Artist – Christopher Cross
Grammy, 1981 – Best Arrangement – "Sailing"
ASCAP Film and Television Music Awards, 1991 – "Arthur's Theme (Best That You Can Do)"

Nominations
 Primetime Emmy Awards, 1988 - Outstanding Achievement in Music and Lyrics, Growing Pains (1985) episode Aloha - "Swept Away"

Notes

References

External links

Living Legends – Christopher Cross Interview Series

1951 births
Living people
Alamo Heights High School alumni
American acoustic guitarists
American male pop singers
American male guitarists
American male singer-songwriters
American pop rock singers
American pop guitarists
American rock guitarists
American rock songwriters
American soft rock musicians
Ballad musicians
Best Original Song Academy Award-winning songwriters
Golden Globe Award-winning musicians
Guitarists from Los Angeles
Guitarists from Texas
Grammy Award winners
Musicians from San Antonio
Reprise Records artists
Singer-songwriters from Texas
Warner Records artists
20th-century American guitarists
20th-century American male singers
21st-century American male singers
20th-century American singers
21st-century American singers
Singer-songwriters from California
American people of German descent
American people of Irish descent